WLTQ (730 AM) is a radio station licensed to Charleston, South Carolina, United States.  The format is Catholic talk, with some programming shared with nearby WWOS. 730 AM is a Canadian and Mexican clear-channel frequency.

History
WPAL was Charleston's first radio station targeting African-Americans. William Saunders bought the station in 1985 after being a part owner since 1971, and he added WPAL-FM in 1994. In 1998, he sold WPAL to Clear Channel.

Clear Channel changed the station call sign to WSCC (though the station was known as WSC) and its format to news/talk in 1999. The station moved from 18th to 16th.
By 2002, WSC was beating WTMA with 25-54 listeners in the early afternoon with Rush Limbaugh, who WSC took from WTMA. But WTMA was the clear winner in other slots.

In 2004, the station aired liberal/progressive talk shows from Air America Radio (Morning Sedition), (The Majority Report) and Jones Radio (The Stephanie Miller Show, The Ed Schultz Show) using the branding "Progressive 730".

In 2005, WLTQ began carrying the Music of Your Life standards feed, which was aired until the Spanish "Viva 730" format began in March 2008.

According to FCC filings, the station was sold to Indigo Radio LLC in July 2008.  The new owners did not have access to the prior station's studio or broadcast facilities.  They received FCC permission for construction at a new location. As of December 2008, the new owners applied for an additional 90 days to remain silent while they constructed their new facilities.

In July 2009, WLTQ returned to the air with black gospel music.

In 2010, Indigo announced the sale of WLTQ to Mediatrix SC LLC, owner of nearby WQIZ, for $525,000. In 2011, WLTQ changed to its current format.

References

External links

FCC History Cards for WLTQ

LTQ (AM)
Radio stations established in 1971
LTQ